Class 80 was the TOPS classification allocated by British Rail to the prototype 25 kV AC electric locomotive.  This locomotive was built by Metropolitan-Vickers, initially as a prototype gas turbine-electric locomotive, numbered 18100.  British Rail allocated the number E1000 (and later E2001) to the locomotive following its conversion from gas turbine propulsion.

Conversion
In addition, it was also converted from Co-Co to A1A-A1A wheel arrangement when the centre traction motor from each bogie was removed. The new traction motor rating (with four motors) was about the same as the original rating (with six motors). This suggests that new traction motors were fitted.

The conversion of the locomotive began in January 1958 when the locomotive was moved from storage at Dukinfield Works to the Bowesfield Works at Stockton-on-Tees. The work involved the removal of the gas turbine unit, main generator, fuel tank, air filters, the centre traction motor from each bogie and all of the ancillary equipment used for the gas turbine unit.

Once the locomotive had been stripped, the new electrical equipment was installed which included the transformer, the Stone-Faiveley pantograph (for which a section of the roof had to be lowered), a Brown Boveri air blast circuit breaker and the Hackbridge-Hewittic mercury arc rectifier units.

The cabs of the locomotive were converted from Western Region right-hand drive to the standard British Rail left-hand drive arrangement. The rebuilt locomotive was completed and ready for trials in October 1958. It retained its original BR black livery, with a silver stripe around the middle of the body and silver numbers.

Usage
The locomotive was used to prepare the ground for the 25 kV AC electrification being installed on the West Coast Main Line, including the testing of overhead line equipment and staff training.

Withdrawal

Once the production locomotives (Class 81 onwards) were in service, E2001 was no longer required. It was put into store at the end of 1961, and lasted for over ten years at various locations. It was officially withdrawn in April 1968 and scrapped in November 1972 at J Cashmore in Great Bridge.

Models 
E1000/E2001 is being made as a kit and a ready-to-run model in OO gauge by Silver Fox Models.

References

Sources

External links

80
Metropolitan-Vickers locomotives
A1A-A1A locomotives
25 kV AC locomotives
Railway locomotives introduced in 1958
Scrapped locomotives
Individual locomotives of Great Britain
Unique locomotives
Standard gauge locomotives of Great Britain